The Beatitudes are sayings of Jesus, and in particular eight blessings recounted by Jesus in the Sermon on the Mount in the Gospel of Matthew, and four in the Sermon on the Plain in the Gospel of Luke, followed by four woes which mirror the blessings. Each is a proverb-like proclamation, without narrative.

In the Latin Vulgate, each of these blessings begins with the word beātī, which translates to "happy", "rich", or "blessed" (plural adjective). The corresponding word in the original Greek is μακάριοι, with the same meanings. Thus "Blessed are the poor in spirit" appears in Latin as beātī pauperēs spīritū. The Latin noun beātitūdō was coined by Cicero to describe a state of blessedness and was later incorporated within the chapter headings written for Matthew 5 in various printed versions of the Vulgate.

While opinions may vary as to exactly how many distinct statements into which the Beatitudes should be divided (ranging from eight to ten), most scholars consider them to be only eight. These eight of Matthew follow a simple pattern: Jesus names a group of people normally thought to be unfortunate and pronounces them blessed.

Matthew 5:3–12 

The eight Beatitudes in Matthew:

The ninth beatitude (Matthew 5:11–12) refers to the bearing of reviling and is addressed to the disciples.

The Beatitudes unique to Matthew are the meek, the merciful, the pure of heart, and the peacemakers, while the other four have similar entries in Luke, but are followed almost immediately by "four woes".  The term "poor in spirit" is unique to Matthew. While thematically similar the introduction of the phrase "Poor in spirit" spiritualizes or ethicizes the poor in their predicament  (in alignment with Isaiah 61) while the Lucan version focuses on their actual hardship, poverty, marginalization and rejection of the poor who will see eventual vindication...

Luke 

 ("Rejoice in that day and leap for joy, because great is your reward in heaven. For that is how their ancestors treated the prophets.") appears to parallel the text in Matthew 5:11–12.

The four woes that follow in Luke 6:24–26

Analysis and interpretation 

Each Beatitude consists of two phrases: the condition and the result. In almost all cases the phrases used are familiar from an Old Testament context, but in the Sermon on the Mount Jesus elevates them to new levels and teachings. Together, the Beatitudes present a new set of ideals that focus on love and humility rather than force and exaction. They echo the highest ideals of Jesus' teachings on spirituality and compassion.

Although the Beatitude concerning the meek has been much praised even by some non-Christians such as Mahatma Gandhi, some view the admonition to meekness skeptically. Friedrich Nietzsche in On the Genealogy of Morals considered the verse to be embodying what he perceived as a slave morality.

In Christian teachings, the works of mercy (good acts that are considered meritorious) have resonated with the theme of the Beatitude for mercy. These teachings emphasize that these acts of mercy provide both temporal and spiritual benefits. The theme of mercy has continued in devotions such as the Divine Mercy in the 20th century.

The term "peacemakers" has traditionally been interpreted to mean not only those who live in peace with others, but also those who do their best to promote friendship among mankind and between God and man. St. Gregory of Nyssa interpreted it as "Godly work", which was an imitation of God's love of man. John Wesley said the peacemakers "endeavour to calm the stormy spirits of men, to quiet their turbulent passions, to soften the minds of contending parties, and, if possible, reconcile them to each other. They use all innocent arts, and employ all their strength, all the talents which God has given them, as well to preserve peace where it is, as to restore it where it is not."

The phrase "poor in spirit" (πτωχοὶ τῷ πνεύματι) in Matthew 5:3 has been subject to a variety of interpretations. A.W. Tozer describes poverty of spirit as "an inward state paralleling the outward circumstances of the common beggar in the streets." It is not a call to material poverty in itself.

William Burnet Wright, seeking to avoid a common misunderstanding of the meaning of poverty of spirit, distinguishes those who are "poor in spirit" from those he calls "poor spirited," who "consider crawling the Christian's proper gait."

In other religious texts 
Also in the New Testament, the Epistle of James contains a verse which is worded in much the same way as the Beatitudes; and which shares themes particularly with Matthew 5:10,12:

In the Book of Mormon, a religious text of the Latter Day Saint movement, Jesus gives a sermon to a group of indigenous Americans including statements very similar to Matthew 6:

The Baháʼí  Lawḥ-i-Aqdas tablet concludes with 21 beatitudes, including this statement:

The Qur'an (e.g., "say the word of humility and enter the gate of paradise") and some Hadith (e.g., "My mercy exceeds my anger") contain some passages with somewhat similar tone, but distinct phraseology, from the Beatitudes.

The Bhagavad Gita and the traditional writings of Buddhism (e.g., some of the Mangala Sutta) have been interpreted as including teachings whose intentions resemble some of the messages of Beatitudes (e.g., humility and absence of ego), although their wording is not the same.

Six "modern Beatitudes" were proposed by Pope Francis during his visit to Malmö, Sweden on All Saints Day 2016:

Bibliography 

 Easwaran, Eknath. Original Goodness (on Beatitudes).  Nilgiri Press, 1989. .
 Kissinger, Warren S. The Sermon on the Mount: A History of Interpretation and Bibliography. Metuchen: Scarecrow Press, 1975.
 Kühl, Ingo Seligpreisungen der Bergpredigt – kolorierte Lithografien (Beatitudes of the Sermon of the Mount – coloured Lithographs), Berlin 1997.
 Twomey, M.W. "The Beatitudes". A Dictionary of Biblical Tradition in English Literature.  Jeffrey, David Lyle ed. Grand Rapids: W.B. Eerdmans, 1992.

See also 

 Community of the Beatitudes
 Divine Mercy
 Life of Jesus in the New Testament
 Mount of Beatitudes

Notes

References

External links 

 Catholic Encyclopedia: The Eight Beatitudes (New Advent).
 The Beatitudes Society 

 
Christian ethics in the Bible
Gospel of Luke
Gospel of Matthew
Hermeneutics
New Testament words and phrases
Sayings of Jesus
Sermon on the Mount
Vulgate Latin words and phrases